Juliet Kelly is a British jazz singer and songwriter.

Biography
Kelly grew up in London and discovered her talent for singing whilst studying economics at university. Mentored by Anita Wardell she then went on to attend the postgraduate jazz course at the Guildhall School of Music and Drama.

Her debut album, Aphrodite's Child received critical acclaim in the UK and the US.  This led to her touring the UK and appearing on BBC Television's Jazz Britannia concert broadcast live from the Barbican in London in 2005.  Her second album Delicious Chemistry was also well received and included appearances from several well-known jazz musicians including Courtney Pine, Sebastian Rochford, Roger Beaujolais and Byron Wallen.  Kelly's third album Licorice Kiss was released in 2009.

In 2015 Kelly released her fourth album "Spellbound Stories"; a set of songs inspired by her favourite novels.

Discography

Leader
2003: Aphrodite's Child (33 Jazz) 
2005: Delicious Chemistry (Chantiko)
2009: Licorice Kiss (Purple Stiletto)
2015: Spellbound Stories (Purple Stiletto)

Featured vocalist
2005: Courtney Pine Resistance
2011: Dimitri Vassilakis Across the Universe

References

External links
Official website

MusicBrainz
Album review on bbc.co.uk

British women jazz singers
English jazz singers
Living people
1970 births
Alumni of the Guildhall School of Music and Drama